Archie Matsos (November 22, 1934 – May 28, 2021) was an American football linebacker. He played for the Buffalo Bills from 1960 to 1962, the Oakland Raiders from 1963 to 1965 and for the Denver Broncos and San Diego Chargers in 1966.

High School and college career
Matsos was a multisport standout at Detroit's Redford High School; he played college football at Michigan State University.

Professional career
Matsos played for seven seasons in the American Football League for four teams. He was on the Sporting News All-AFL team in 1960 and 1963, and an AFL Eastern Division All-Star in 1961 and 1962.

He died on May 28, 2021, in Lansing, Michigan at age 86.

See also
 List of American Football League players

References

1934 births
2021 deaths
Redford High School alumni
Players of American football from Detroit
American football linebackers
Michigan State Spartans football players
Buffalo Bills players
Denver Broncos (AFL) players
Oakland Raiders players
San Diego Chargers players
American Football League players
American Football League All-League players
American Football League All-Star players